Colorado's 11th Senate district is one of 35 districts in the Colorado Senate. It has been represented by Democrat Tony Exum since 2023. Prior to redistricting the district was represented by Democrats Pete Lee and Michael Merrifield.

Geography
District 11 is based in central Colorado Springs in El Paso County, also stretching to cover the nearby communities of Manitou Springs and Stratmoor.

The district is located entirely within Colorado's 5th congressional district, and overlaps with the 17th, 18th, and 20th districts of the Colorado House of Representatives.

Recent election results
Colorado state senators are elected to staggered four-year terms; under normal circumstances, the 11th district holds elections in midterm years.

2022
The 2022 election will be the first one held under the state's new district lines. Democratic incumbent Pete Lee now lives in the 12th district, meaning he won't be able to run for the Senate at all in 2022, and 2nd district Republican senator Dennis Hisey is running in the 11th district instead.

Historical election results

2018

2014

2013 recall
In 2013, an attempt to recall incumbent Democrat John Morse over his support for gun control legislation was successful, resulting in the election of Republican Bernie Herpin.

Federal and statewide results in District 11

References 

11
El Paso County, Colorado